Chidinma Favour Edeji   (born 15 December 1995) is a Nigerian football midfielder. She played in the Turkish Women's First Football League for Amed S.K. with jersey number 20. She is a member of the Nigeria women's national team.

Player career

Club
She was part of the  Treasure Coast Dynamites of Port St. Lucie, Florida in the 2017 Women's Premier Soccer League.

In October 2018, she moved to Turkey, and joined the Diyarbakır-based club Amed S.K. to play in the Turkish Women's First Football League.

International
Edeji was a member of the Nigeria girls' U-17 team, and played in one of the three the 2012 FIFA U-17 Women's World Cup matches held in Azerbaijan. She took part in a match against France in October 2012.

Career statistics
.

References

Living people
1995 births
Sportspeople from Imo State
Nigerian women's footballers
Women's association football midfielders
Nigeria women's international footballers
Nigerian expatriate women's footballers
Nigerian expatriate sportspeople in the United States
Expatriate women's soccer players in the United States
Nigerian expatriate sportspeople in Turkey
Expatriate women's footballers in Turkey
Amed S.K. (women) players
Bayelsa Queens F.C. players